Conospermum microflorum is a shrub endemic to Western Australia.

It blooms between September and October, producing white flowers.

It is found on plains along the west coast in the Gascoyne and Mid West regions of Western Australia, where it grows in sandy soils.

References

External links

Eudicots of Western Australia
microflorum
Endemic flora of Western Australia
Plants described in 1995